Encephalartos longifolius is a low-growing palm-like cycad in the family Zamiaceae. It is endemic to South Africa and is commonly known as Thunberg's cycad, breadpalm or broodboom. This cycad is listed as near threatened in the IUCN Red List of Threatened Species.

Description

The breadpalm grows up to three metres tall and develops a very thick trunk with age. This is crowned with dark or metallic green, semi-glossy, arching leaves up to two metres long and moderately keeled. The leaflets are lanceolate, overlapping upwards and have smooth margins. There are one to three green, ovoid male cones up to sixty centimetres long and twenty centimetres in diameter. A similar number of green female cones are more robust with a diameter of up to forty centimetres. The seeds are red and can reach five centimetres long.

Distribution
This species is found in coastal regions of Eastern Cape Province, South Africa growing at heights of up to six hundred metres. It  grows in a variety of different habitats on the mountain ridges from west of Joubertina in the Kouga mountains east to near Grahamstown. There are a large number of locations where breadpalms grow but on the whole, populations are declining.

Historical note
In their book on South African trees, published in 1972, Eve Palmer and Norah Pitman wrote:

References

External links
 
 
The Gymnosperm Database.

longifolius
Trees of South Africa